A keyhole race is a speed event commonly seen at equestrian events and gymkhanas, in which the horse and rider team with the fastest time in completing the event wins. Horses running this event must have speed, but also the agility to stop quickly in full stride, turn, and bolt directly back into a run.

Course
The obstacle course is a pattern, usually marked with white powder (commonly flour or powdered chalk) poured into a "keyhole" shape in the dirt. The pattern varies between events. According to the California Gymkhana Association, the pattern should be set up as follows:
 from arena gate to timing line.
 from timing line to center of keyhole.
The pattern may also be made of cones or poles set up in a similar pattern.

Timing
The event begins when the horse and rider cross the timing line. The team enters the keyhole at a gallop, then turns in either direction inside the keyhole's circle without stepping over the chalk. The horse and the rider turns as fast as they can in the bulb. The team then exits the keyhole again at a gallop and the time ends once they cross the timing line.

Winning times for this event range from 5 to 10 seconds.

Penalties may be applied to a team's time. Each gymkhana or event may operate under different rules and therefore the penalties may be different. Penalties may include adding five seconds to the team's time, or may even be enough to disqualify the contestant completely.

External links
 https://web.archive.org/web/20080607065134/http://www.calgymkhana.com/Public_Pages/ThirteenPlus/Keyhole.aspx

Mounted games